Gervase Andrew Hephner (February 5, 1936 – June 26, 2011) was a Wisconsin politician and legislator. He was a member of the Wisconsin Assembly, serving the 6th District from 1967 until 1986.

Background
Born in Rantoul, Wisconsin, Hephner attended St. Norbert College, and later graduated from the University of Wisconsin–Oshkosh in 1960.  He was an Army veteran of the Korean War from 1954 to 1956. Hephner enlisted near the end of the war and served as the driver for General Maxwell D. Taylor. He achieved the rank of Specialist Third Class. He was also a member of the Knights of Columbus, and was a former secretary of the Calumet County Democratic Party.

He also farmed and developed land during his life just outside Chilton, Wisconsin. He had a lodge in rural Marinette County, Wisconsin near Athelstane. Hephner planted hundreds of trees at the lodge and (along with his wife Kay) was named Tree Farmers of the Year.

Politician
Hephner served in the Wisconsin Assembly from 1967 until 1986. During his tenure, he authored many bills, including the bill that established the Veterinary College at the University of Wisconsin-Madison. He left the Assembly to run for the state's Lieutenant Governor position but his bid failed.

Later life and death
After leaving politics, he became a lobbyist.  He died at the Calumet Medical Center in Chilton on June 26, 2011. He was buried at the St. Augustine Catholic Cemetery.

References

1936 births
2011 deaths
People from Rantoul, Wisconsin
Farmers from Wisconsin
Military personnel from Wisconsin
St. Norbert College alumni
University of Wisconsin–Oshkosh alumni
Democratic Party members of the Wisconsin State Assembly
People from Chilton, Wisconsin